Paweł Alojzy Tuchlin (April 28, 1946 – May 25, 1987) was a Polish serial killer code-named Scorpion by the Milicja Obywatelska. He was sentenced to death and hanged for the murder of 9 women and a further 11 attempted murders, spanning from 1975 to 1983.

Childhood and youth 
Tuchlin was born to father Bernard, an abusive alcoholic farmer and mother Monika (née Woier) where he was the eighth child out of eleven siblings. He was severely mistreated by both parents. He still wet the bed as a teenager and everyone in the village knew about it. Tuchlin said in court:He ended his military service after a few months, when it turned out that he had impaired hearing.

Tuchlin fled to Gdańsk, got a job as a driver and got married. During this period he was sentenced for minor thefts. He served those sentences from December 20, 1976 to June 28, 1979. Some time later he divorced his wife and remarried a woman named Regina. His neighbors described him as a calm, stable, resourceful man who cared for his wife and two children, yet he was very introverted. At the time, he was having problems with his libido, as well as exhibitionism.

Murders and sexual assaults 
Tuchlin attacked his victims in Gdańsk, near Starogard Gdański, Skarszewy, Tczew, and also in the area of then Elbląg and Bydgoszcz voivodeships. His youngest victim was 18 years old, and his oldest 35.

 List of deaths

Investigation, arrest, psychiatric evaluation, trial and sentence 

The police became aware of a possible serial killer as early as November 1979. On the November 18th, 1979 Tuchlin attacked 18-year-old Irena H. While doing so he lost the murder weapon, a hammer, in the Radunia river, next to the place of the assault. The word ZNTK, or Rolling Paper Stock Works, had been engraved in the metal. The militia received a list of all the people using the tools, but Tuchlin was not listed. They interrogated everyone who had been recorded to have picked up the hammer but they all had credible alibis. It is probable that the store owner either missed Tuchlin, did not record his name or he simply stole the hammer while he worked at the company for two weeks.

The hammer was carefully wrapped up with a bandage because, as the murderer later revealed, the hammer caught him cold in the stomach while he wore it in his pants looking for victims.

On January 6, 1983, a special group was formed under the name "Scorpion", consisting of 11 people at the Provincial Headquarters.

Tuchlin was arrested on May 31, 1983 at the age of 37, on suspicion of theft of wood and parlor. During the search of his farm, among other things, the car registration number GDM 1418 was found in the trunk of the vehicle, along with the hammer on whose handle was the blood of the victims.

Tuchlin spent 6 months on psychiatric observation in Szczecin, where he was perceived as kind and helpful, he discovered his artistic talents, even winning a competition for making bread sculptures. The good material, mixed with saliva, could make the bread form and then congeal any form it was given. Tuchlin made three vaginal mock-ups in this way, even decorating them with natural bristles. He fell in love with a psychiatrist, beginning to write letters to her. So that she could not underestimate him, because only he knew what the words "real man" meant. He gave one of those sheaths as a gift to her. The doctor suffered a nervous breakdown.

During the course of the investigation, Tuchlin admitted to 10 murders and 11 attempted murders. As he claimed during the interrogation, he murdered to feel better. At the hearing, however, he recanted his testimony, claiming that he was forced to confess by the police. The regional court in Gdańsk sentenced Tuchlin to death for 9 murders and 11 attempted murders on August 6, 1985. The Supreme Court upheld the sentence and the State Council decided not to grant leniency. The sentence was carried out and Tuchlin was hanged at the detention center at 12 Kurkowa Street on May 25, 1987. After his death, he was decapitated and immersed in a formalin jar, which later went missing. He was buried in the Łostowicki cemetery in Gdańsk, at one of the NN headquarters. According to Marek Maj, a defender of Tuchlin during the investigation, gravediggers urinated in the coffin before the lid was closed.

See also
List of serial killers by country

References

Bibliography 

 Documentary film "Skorpion" from the TVP2 series of reportages §148 Death penalty;
 "Scorpion time", Michał Pruski, Zbigniew Żukowski, KAW 1985;
 "Beasts in human skin: Tuchlin: Scorpion", documentary film, Polsat Crime, 2013. 
 Documentary series shown on TVP Info and TVP Regionalna:  "Zbrodni Archives" episode 11 pt. Codename Scorpion

External links 
 Roman Daszczynski - "Scorpion" attack. The fate of survivors [access June 16, 2013]
 Adam Zadworny - The Scorpion Case. Attacked when weather changed. [access June 8, 2013]
 Roman Daszczyński - I was sitting behind Scorpion. Why did I confess? Because they beat me [access July 7, 2013]

1946 births
1975 murders in Poland
1983 murders in Poland
1987 deaths
1970s murders in Poland
1980s murders in Poland
Executed Polish serial killers
Male serial killers
People executed by Poland by hanging
People executed by the Polish People's Republic
People from Gdańsk